Tawwabin uprising or the penitents uprising refers to the uprising of a group of Kufan pro-Alids after the Battle of Karbala to take revenge for the murder of Husayn ibn Ali, whom they had invited to Kufa in 680 CE (60 AH). The group was led by Sulayman ibn Surad Khuzai, a companion of the Islamic prophet Muhammad. The army of Tawwabin fought against Umayyad army in the Battle of 'Ayn al-Warda in January 685. They were defeated and their leaders were killed.

Background and formation of the Tawwabin 
After the accession of the second Umayyad caliph, Yazid, the Kufans invited Husyan ibn Ali to lead a revolt against him. While on his way to Kufa, Husayn was killed in the Battle of Karbala by the government forces, and the support of Kufan Shia did not materialize. Kufans were regretful and blamed themselves for not having done anything to help Husayn. Following these emotions, an organized movement was started by a group of Kufan Shia, who called themselves Tawwabin (the penitents). The uprising started under the leadership of five followers of Husayn's father Ali ibn Abi Talib, and initially comprised one hundred Kufans, all aged sixty years or more. They held their first meeting in the house of Sulayman ibn Surad Khuzai, a companion of Muhammad, in 61 AH (680/81 CE), in which Sulayman was elected as the leader of the uprising. The movement remained secret until 64 AH (683/84 CE). After the death of Yazid and the start of the Second Fitna, the Iraqis drove out the Umayyad governor Ubayd Allah ibn Ziyad and Iraq came under Abd Allah ibn al-Zubayr's influence. The collapse of Umayyad authority eased conditions for the Tawwabin and they publicly started calling for support to their cause.

The movement had no further goals apart from fighting the Umayyads and atoning for their failure to support Husayn. Their slogan was "Ya Latharat al-Husayn". Some 16,000 people enlisted in the register of Sulayman. They secretly gathered soldiers and weapons from Kufa and the tribes around it. Sulayman secured support of Shia leaders in Basra and al-Mada'in by sending letters.

Start of the uprising 
In Rabi' al-thani of 65 AH (November/December 684 CE), Sulayman summoned his men that had joined his army to Nukhayla. Out of 16,000 people that had promised to show up, only 4000 were present. One of the reasons was that Mukhtar al-Thaqafi believed that Sulayman had no experience of wars, so many Shia, especially those from Mada'in and Basra, from Khuzai's army began to abandon him in large numbers. Finally, 1000 more left the army. The army spent three days in Nukhayla, and then went to Karbala to mourn at the grave of Husayn.

Battle of Ayn al-Warda 

After visiting Karbala, the army arrived at Qarqisia. The Tawwabin pressed on to Ayn al-Warda (identified with Ra's al-Ayn), where they met an Umayyad army of 20,000, under command of Husayn ibn Numayr. The battle started on 4 January 685 and lasted for three days. Although the Tawwabin held the upper hand in a first skirmish, over the next two days the numerical superiority of the Umayyad army began to prevail. Finally, Sulayman was killed and the Tawwabin were almost annihilated. Rifa bin Shaddad advised the survivors to return and brought them to Qarqisiya. The small number of Tawwabin who survived the battle, went over to Mukhtar al-Thaqafi. These Kufans, who formed the backbone of Mukhtar's movement, called themselves Shia al-Mahdi, Shia al-Haqq or Shia al-Muhammad. In his book, The origins and early development of Shia Islam, Seyed Husain Mohammad Jafari argues that the Tawwabin were apparently defeated, but in fact they formed the first ever integrated Shia organization, which was influenced by Husayn's thinking, in order to serve the Shia community.

References

Sources
 
 
 
 
 
 

Husayn ibn Ali
Battle of Karbala
Second Fitna
Rebellions against the Umayyad Caliphate
680s in the Umayyad Caliphate
680s conflicts